Serge Roy (born June 25, 1962) is a Canadian retired professional ice hockey defenceman and Olympian.

Roy played with Team Canada at the 1988 Winter Olympics held in Calgary, Alberta.

Career statistics

Regular season and playoffs

International

References

External links

1962 births
Living people
Adirondack Red Wings players
Brantford Smoke players
Canadian ice hockey defencemen
Fort Wayne Komets players
Fresno Falcons players
Laval Voisins players
New Haven Nighthawks players
Nova Scotia Voyageurs players
People from Sept-Îles, Quebec
Phoenix Roadrunners (IHL) players
San Diego Gulls (WCHL) players
Skellefteå AIK players
VEU Feldkirch players
Olympic ice hockey players of Canada
Ice hockey players at the 1988 Winter Olympics
New Jersey Rockin' Rollers players
San Diego Barracudas players
Canadian expatriate ice hockey players in Austria
Canadian expatriate ice hockey players in Sweden